Farhad Kouchakzadeh is an Iranian football manager. He played as a player for Nassaji, Aboomoslem and Saipa. He has a history of coaching Nassaji Mazandaran.

References

External links

Living people
Iranian football managers
People from Qaem Shahr
Iranian footballers
F.C. Nassaji Mazandaran managers
Nassaji Mazandaran players
F.C. Aboomoslem players
Saipa F.C. players
Sportspeople from Mazandaran province
1969 births